Section 1 may refer to:

Section 1 of the Canadian Charter of Rights and Freedoms
Section 1 of the Constitution of Australia
Internal Revenue Code section 1 in the United States
Section 1 (NYSPHSAA), the southern Hudson Valley section of the New York State Public High School Athletic Association, U.S.
The section of which a small plane crashed at Memorial Stadium, Baltimore in 1976.

See also

MI1, or British Military Intelligence, Section 1